Spider-Man 2: The Sinister Six (or Spider-Man 2: Enter the Sinister Six in Europe) is a 2001 platform video game based on the Marvel Comics character Spider-Man. It was developed by Torus Games and published by Activision for the Game Boy Color. The game released on May 30, 2001. It is an alternative sequel to Spider-Man (2000), and mostly follows the events of the Game Boy Color version of that game. Though it has a similar format, it is not related to  Spider-Man: Return of the Sinister Six (1992). 

A canonical sequel to the first game, Spider-Man 2: Enter Electro, was eventually released on August 26, 2001  (but re-released on October 19, 2001) as a PlayStation exclusive, followed by a standalone sequel, Spider-Man: Mysterio's Menace, released on September 19, 2001 for the Game Boy Advance.

Gameplay 

The player controls Spider-Man through six side-scrolling levels, battling minor thugs and minions until defeating the villains in a boss fight at the end of each level. During gameplay, Spider-Man is able to jump, punch, kick, climb walls, and use his web shooters to web-swing or temporarily stun enemies. Each level involves completing a secondary objective before letting the player access the stage's boss encounter, such as finding keys to unlock doors or seeking out specific enemies who impede the player's progress.

Plot
The plot of the game revolves around the kidnapping of Aunt May and Spider-Man's efforts to save her from the group of villains who call themselves the Sinister Six: Mysterio, Sandman, Vulture, Scorpion, Kraven, and the mastermind of the group's plans, Doctor Octopus.

Dr. Otto Octavius holds a meeting of the Sinister Six during the opening credits sequence of the game. Explaining his plot, Octavius first instructs the members of the Six to hunt down Peter Parker, Spider-Man's photographer, to send a message to their shared enemy. Upon reaching the Parker household, Sandman and the Scorpion realize that Peter isn't home. In Peter's place, the pair kidnaps Peter's aunt, May Parker, and leave a message for Peter, instructing him to "tell Spidey to go to the Coney Island Pier". 

Spider-Man fights through a variety of enemies who patrol the area's sewers and carnival attractions before encountering Mysterio and a number of his hologram duplicates. After his defeat, Mysterio disappears as he gleefully taunts Spider-Man about distracting him from his original task of heading to the pier. Spider-Man then makes his way to the pier, fighting several enemies and being forced to hunt for a key, which one of the nearby thugs possesses. After a brief battle with Sandman, the villain mumbles something about the Vulture being at the World Trade Center before passing out.

At the World Trade Center, Spider-Man must unlock a series of doors to access the roofs of the Twin Towers. Upon accessing the outside of the complex, Spider-Man is attacked by the Vulture, who drops a clue leading to Madison Square Garden.

Following the clue, Spider-Man battles Scorpion in the massive arena, who tells Peter to make his way to Central Park for his next challenge. Under the cover of a massive thunderstorm, Spider-Man pushes through zoo exhibits and more henchmen, eventually coming upon Kraven the Hunter. Never one to back away from a challenge, the sportsman engages in a fierce battle with Spider-Man, charging at him with his spear and throwing a variety of knives. Regretting the kidnapping because it lacks honor, Kraven recognizes his foe's fighting prowess and directs him to go to the Empire State University for his sixth and final challenge.

In the penultimate stage of the game, the player must progress through the ESU campus, sneaking through lecture halls and classrooms to reach Dr. Octopus. Amidst bubbling vats of green liquid and enormous pieces of machinery, Spider-Man defeats Doctor Octopus. With the entire complex shaking as a result of the battle, the leader of the Sinister Six falls to the ground, swearing that one day, he will be victorious. In the epilogue, Peter thinks about getting Aunt May an unlisted address after escorting her home safely.

Reception

The game was met with mixed to positive reviews, as GameRankings gave it a score of 70.29%.

References

External links

2001 video games
Activision games
Game Boy Color games
Game Boy Color-only games
Video games based on Spider-Man
Video games developed in Australia
Video games set in New York City
Superhero video games
Torus Games games
Platform games